Yahya Kassim Issa (born 25 September 1950) is a Tanzanian CCM politician and Member of Parliament for Chwaka constituency since 2000. Issa was originally a teacher from 1974 to 1982, and moved up in rank in the Ministry of Education, becoming a section leader in 1975, a headmaster in 1984, and a district education inspector in 1991. He arrived at his current position in 1995.

References

1950 births
Living people
Tanzanian Muslims
Chama Cha Mapinduzi MPs
Tanzanian MPs 2010–2015